Hvite gutter (English: White Boys) is a Norwegian sitcom series that premiered in 2018 on TVNorge and Dplay.

It was created and written by Jørgen Evensen, Johannes Roaldsen Fürst, Eirik Hvattum Bjørnstad and Torjus Tveiten, who also play the four main characters. Approaching the end of their 20s, they still live a carefree life in Frogner, Oslo.

At the premiere, the series was given a "die throw" of 4 in Dagbladet, 3 in VG and in Stavanger Aftenblad; and 2 in Dagsavisen.

The series has been nominated several times to the Gullruten award.

References

External links
Streaming

TVNorge original programming
2018 Norwegian television series debuts
2010s Norwegian television series
2020s Norwegian television series
Norwegian television sitcoms
Television shows set in Oslo